Andrei Ivanovich Maslovskiy (born 24 June 1982) is a former Russian professional football player.

Club career
He played 2 seasons in the Russian Football National League for FC Nosta Novotroitsk and FC Dynamo Bryansk.

External links
 

1982 births
Sportspeople from Rostov-on-Don
Living people
Russian footballers
Association football midfielders
FC Rostov players
FC Dynamo Bryansk players
FC Sheksna Cherepovets players
FC Avangard Kursk players
FC Chayka Peschanokopskoye players
FC Nosta Novotroitsk players